Baroness Campbell may refer to:

Elspeth Campbell, Baroness Campbell of Pittenweem (born 1940), wife of Menzies Campbell
Sue Campbell, Baroness Campbell of Loughborough (born 1948), British sports administrator
Jane Campbell, Baroness Campbell of Surbiton (born 1959), British campaigner